Damián Blaum (born June 11, 1981 in Buenos Aires, Argentina) is an Olympic open water swimmer from Argentina. Blaum swam for Argentina at the 2008 Olympics where he finished 21st in the Men's 10K event. He is Jewish.

References

1981 births
Male long-distance swimmers
Living people
Argentine Jews
Argentine male swimmers
Swimmers from Buenos Aires
Swimmers at the 2008 Summer Olympics
Swimmers at the 2011 Pan American Games
Olympic swimmers of Argentina
Jewish swimmers
Jewish Argentine sportspeople
South American Games bronze medalists for Argentina
South American Games medalists in swimming
Competitors at the 2010 South American Games
Pan American Games competitors for Argentina
20th-century Argentine people
21st-century Argentine people